Mark Ladwig (born May 6, 1980) is an American former competitive pair skater. He is best known for his partnership with Amanda Evora, with whom he competed at the 2010 Winter Olympics, placing tenth. They won bronze at an ISU Grand Prix event, the 2010 Cup of Russia, and two U.S. national silver medals. He later skated with Lindsay Davis for one season.

Personal life
Mark Ladwig was born in Fargo, North Dakota to Carol and John, a medical technician and a doctor respectively, and grew up in Moorhead, Minnesota with two siblings, Todd and Erin. He married his wife, Janet, in August 2006. A boy named Holden Everett was born September 13, 2009. A second son, Felix Rye Ladwig, was born July 1, 2014.

Career
Ladwig skated with Kelsey Sollom until 1999 in Moorhead, Minnesota and then with Keri Blakinger while at the University of Delaware Figure Skating Club in Newark, Delaware. He volunteered at the 2002 Winter Olympics and worked in Salt Lake Olympic Square.

In June 2002, Ladwig began skating with Amanda Evora. They finished 12th in their debut at the U.S. Championships and fifth at their first ISU Championship, the 2005 Four Continents. In 2007, Ladwig began serving on the U.S. Figure Skating Athletes Advisory Committee. He was the pairs vice-chair of the 2008–09 Athletes Advisory Committee.

2009–10 was a breakthrough season for Evora/Ladwig. They took second at the U.S Championships, their best finish at the event, which led to their selection for the US Olympic team. At the 2010 Vancouver Olympics, they beat their previous personal best by a sizable margin, and finished tenth, making them the top US pair at the Olympics. They later competed at Worlds for the first time in their career, and finished in ninth place.

During 2010–2011 season, Evora/Ladwig were assigned to compete at Cup of China where they finished fifth (151.66 pts) and later earned their first Grand Prix medal, a bronze, at Rostelecom Cup, with a season's best of 110.27 and total score of 162.85. Evora/Ladwig repeated at US Nationals earning their second silver medal, and were selected to compete at Four Continents and Worlds. At Four Continents, Ladwig's left skate heel broke during the short program, but he and Evora were able to resume the program within the allowed three minutes after Canadian Rudi Swiegers lent his own boot to Ladwig. Ladwig was able to repair his skate prior to the free skate, and the pair went on to finish sixth overall. Evora/Ladwig were noted for their longevity as a pair, which is rare in U.S. pair skating. Their partnership ended when Evora retired from competitive skating on April 10, 2012.

Ladwig was elected to the USOC AAC in 2012. In May, he announced that he had teamed up with Lindsay Davis. Davis/Ladwig competed at two Grand Prix events and won the pewter medal at the 2013 U.S. Championships. They confirmed the end of their partnership in February 2013.

Programs

With Davis

With Evora

Competitive highlights

With Davis

With Evora

With Blakinger

References

External links

 
 
 
 
 
 
 

1980 births
Living people
American male pair skaters
Sportspeople from Fargo, North Dakota
University of Delaware people
Figure skaters at the 2010 Winter Olympics
Olympic figure skaters of the United States
20th-century American people
21st-century American people